Strtenik is a small settlement in the hills north of Slovenske Konjice in eastern Slovenia. The area is part of the traditional region of Styria. The entire Municipality of Slovenske Konjice is now included in the Savinja Statistical Region.

References

External links
Strtenik at Geopedia

Populated places in the Municipality of Slovenske Konjice